The 1964 United States Senate election in Arizona took place on November 3, 1964. Incumbent Republican U.S. Senator Barry Goldwater decided not to run for reelection to a third term, instead running for President of the United States as the Republican Party nominee against Lyndon B. Johnson. Governor of Arizona Paul Fannin ran unopposed in the Republican primary, and defeated Democratic nominee Roy Elson, who was a staff member for U.S. Senator Carl Hayden until Hayden's retirement in 1969.

Despite a landslide loss throughout the country, and Goldwater only able to obtain 50.45% of the vote in his home state of Arizona, Fannin managed to prevail in the state's Senate election.

Republican primary

Candidates
 Paul Fannin, Governor of Arizona

Democratic primary

Candidates
 Roy Elson, staff member to U.S. Senator Carl Hayden
 Renz L. Jennings, Justice of the Arizona Supreme Court
 Howard V. Peterson, lawyer
 George Gavin
 Raymond G. Neely, author
 Robert P. Ketterer

Results

General election

See also 
 United States Senate elections, 1964

References

1964
Arizona
United States Senate